David Daniel may refer to:

 David Daniel (politician) (1903–1962), member of the Queensland Legislative Assembly
 David Daniel (rugby union) (1871–1948), Welsh rugby union forward
 David E. Daniel (born 1949), Deputy Chancellor of the University of Texas System
 David S. Daniel, CEO of Spencer Stuart